Franz Grill (c. 1756–1793) was a composer of the Classical Era.  He was a composer of piano and chamber music.  Little is known of his life, but he died on 18 August 1793 in Ödenburg also known as Sopron, Hungary.

Compositions
Opus 1 Three Sonatas for Violin and Piano
Opus 2 Three Sonatas for Violin and Piano (opp. 1 and 2 were published by Franz Anton Hoffmeister titled Six Duos concertants)
Opus 3 Three String Quartets (Dedicated to Joseph Haydn)
Opus 4 Three Sonatas for Violin and Piano
Opus 5 Three String Quartets
Opus 6 Three Sonatas for Violin and Piano
Opus 7 Six String Quartets (C major, E-flat, B-flat major, G minor, D major, A major)
two cycles of each 12 minuets
German Dances
several smaller piano works, such as a "Rondeau et Final in Dis"

References

 Agnes Sas - Ilona Ferenczi: Franz Grill in: Discotheca Hungarica, Budapest 2001.
 Katalin Komlos: The Viennese Keyboard Trio in the 1780s: Sociological Background and Contemporary Reception in: Music & Letters, Vol. 68, No. 3 (07/1987), pp. 222–234

External links
 

1750s births
1793 deaths
Austrian male composers
Austrian composers
Year of birth uncertain
People from Sopron
18th-century composers
18th-century Austrian male musicians
String quartet composers